Movin' On is the third studio album by the Commodores, released by Motown Records in 1975.

Reception

The album reached number 29 on the Billboard 200 albums chart and number seven on the R&B albums chart. The only single released from the album, "Sweet Love", a mid-tempo ballad about "the virtues of peace and harmony during troubled times," reached number five on the Billboard Hot 100 chart in 1976, making it the group's first top ten hit on the chart.  However, the last track, "Cebu", became a staple on the "Quiet Storm" radio stations, and appeared as a B-side to two of their later singles, "Fancy Dancer" (1976) and "Only You" (1983).

Allmusic rated the album four and a half out of five stars.

The cover artwork of the 2012 Van Halen album A Different Kind of Truth drew comparisons to that of Movin' On.

Track listing

Personnel 

Commodores
 Lionel Richie – vocals, saxophones, keyboards
 Milan Williams – keyboards
 Thomas McClary – vocals, guitars 
 Ronald LaPread – bass 
 Walter Orange – vocals, drums, percussion 
 William King – trumpet 

Additional personnel
 Cal Harris – ARP synthesizer programming

Production 
 Commodores – producers, arrangements 
 James Anthony Carmichael – producer, arrangements 
 Cal Harris – engineer, mixing, technical direction 
 Frank Mulvey – art direction, design 
 Peter Palombi – cover illustration 
 Antonin Kratochvil – liner photography

Charts

Singles

External links
 Commodores-Movin' On at Discogs

References

Commodores albums
1975 albums
Albums produced by James Anthony Carmichael
Albums produced by Lionel Richie
Motown albums